Silvino Ferreira (1 February 1915 – 3 May 1992) was a Brazilian sports shooter. He competed in the 50 m pistol event at the 1948 Summer Olympics.

References

1915 births
1992 deaths
Brazilian male sport shooters
Olympic shooters of Brazil
Shooters at the 1948 Summer Olympics
Sportspeople from Rio de Janeiro (city)